Bird is an English surname, probably deriving from the vertebrates of the same name. Another common variant of this surname is "Byrd."

A–I
 Aaron Bird (born 1983), Australian cricketer
 Alan Bird (1906–1962), Australian politician
 Alan C. Bird (born 1938), British ophthalmologist
 Albert Bird (1867–1927), British cricketer
 Alfred Bird (1811–1878), British food manufacturer and chemist
 Alfred Frederick Bird (1849–1922), British, chemist, food manufacturer, and politician
 Andrew Bird (born 1973), American musician, songwriter, and multi-instrumentalist
 Antonia Bird (1951–2013), British director
 Anthony Bird (1931–2016), British Anglican priest, physician, and principal
 Arthur H. Bird (1856–1923), American composer
 Augustus A. Bird (1802–1870), American politician
 Bill Bird (1888–1963), American journalist
 Billie Bird (1908–2002), American actress and comedian
 Bob Bird, newspaper editor
 Bob Bird (politician) (born 1951), political activist and teacher
 Bobby Bird, musician
 Brad Bird (born 1957), American director and writer
 Bud Bird (born 1932), Canadian politician
 Calvin Bird (1938–2013), American football player
 Carmel Bird (born 1940), Australian writer
 Charlie Bird (born 1949), Irish journalist
 Christopher Bird (1928–1996), American journalist
 Claire B. Bird (1868–1954), American politician
 Corey Bird (born 1995), American baseball player
 Cuthbert Hilton Golding-Bird (1848–1939), British surgeon, son of Golding Bird
 David Bird (journalist) (died 2014), American journalist
 David Bird (bridge writer) (born 1946), British writer on Bridge
 Derrick Bird (1957–2010), English spree killer
 Dickie Bird (born 1933), English cricket umpire
 Dillard E. Bird (1906–1990), American industrial and consulting engineer
 Don Bird (1908–1987), English football player
 Doreen Bird (1928–2004), British dance instructor and dance school founder
 Doug Bird (born 1950), American baseball pitcher
 Edward Bird (1772–1819), English painter
 Edward Wheler Bird, founder of the British-Israelite Movement
 Eugene K. Bird (1926–2005), American military officer
 Florence Bird (1908–1998), Canadian journalist and politician
 Forrest Bird (1921–2015), American physician and inventor
 Frederic Mayer Bird (1838–1908), American educator and clergyman
 George Bird (baseball) (1850–1940), American baseball outfielder
 Gillian Bird, Australian diplomat
 Golding Bird (1814–1854), British doctor
 Greg Bird (baseball) (born 1992), American baseball infielder
 Greg Bird (rugby league) (born 1984), Australian rugby league player
 Harlan P. Bird (1838–1912), American politician
 Harley Bird (born 2001), British voice actress
 Helen Louisa Bostwick Bird (1826–1907), American author, poet
 Henry Edward Bird (1830–1908), English chess player and writer
 Ian Bird (field hockey) (born 1970), Canadian ice hockey player
 Ian Bird (software developer), game designer
 Ira W. Bird (1819–1899), American politician
 Isabella Bird (1831–1904), English writer and historian

J–Z
 Jackie Bird (born 1962), Scottish broadcaster
 Jake Bird (1901–1949), American serial killer and burglar
Jake Bird (baseball) (born 1995), American baseball pitcher 
 John Bird (actor) (born 1936), British actor and comedian
 John Bird (artist) (1766–1829), Welsh landscape artist
 John Bird (astronomer) (1709–1776), British astronomer and instrument designer
 John Bird (bishop) (died 1558), British Bishop of Chester
 John Bird (New York) (1768–1806), American politician
 John Bird (footballer) (born 1948), British football player and manager
 John Bird (entrepreneur), founder of Big Issue
 John Taylor Bird (1829–1911), American politician
 Kai Bird (born 1951), American author
 Larry Bird (Canadian football) (born 1945), Canadian footballer
 Larry Bird (born 1956), American basketball player
 Lester Bird (1938–2021), American athlete and politician
 Lloyd C. Bird (1894–1978), American politician
 Martina Topley-Bird (born 1975), British singer
 Michael J. Bird (1928–2001), British writer
 Morice Bird (1888–1933), British cricketer
 Nancy Bird Walton (1915–2009), Australian aviator
 Norman Bird (1920–2005), British actor
 Peter Bird (rower) (1947–1996), British ocean rower
 Richard Bird (actor) (1894–1986), British actor
 Richard Ely Bird (1878–1955), American politician
 Richard Bird (computer scientist) (1943–2022), professor at Oxford
 Robert Bird (Welsh politician) (1839–1909), Welsh politician
 Sir Robert Bird, 2nd Baronet (1876–1960), British politician
 Robert Byron Bird (1924–2020), American educator and chemical engineer
 Robert Montgomery Bird (1806–1854), American playwright, novelist, photographer, and physician
 Ronnie Bird (footballer) (1941–2005), English football player
 Rose Bird (1936–1999), Chief Justice of California
 Ruth Bird (1899–1987), English historian and schoolteacher
 Sam Bird (born 1987), British racing driver
 Sharon Bird (born 1962), Australian politician
 Simon Bird (born 1984), British actor
 Sue Bird (born 1980), American basketball player
 Sue Bird (engineer), British acoustical engineer
 Tony Bird (singer-songwriter), South African singer and songwriter
 Tony Bird (footballer born 1974), Welsh football player
 Vere Bird (1910–1999), prime minister of Antigua and Barbuda
 Víctor Bird (born 1982), Puerto Rican volleyball player
 Walter James Bird (1863–1953), organ builder based in Birmingham, England
 Will R. Bird (1891–1984), Canadian writer
 Wallis Bird (born 1982), Irish musician

See also
 Justice Bird (disambiguation)
 Byrd (surname), a variant spelling of the same surname
 Golding-Bird (disambiguation)

References

English-language surnames
Surnames from nicknames